Kjell Uno Jörgen Tånnander (born 25 June 1927) is a retired Swedish decathlete who won a bronze medal at the 1950 European Athletics Championships. He competed at the 1948 and 1952 Summer Olympics and finished in 15th and 7th place, respectively. His daughters Annette and Kristine became Olympic heptathletes.

Tånnander won the Swedish decathlon title in 1949 and 1951. Between 1949 and 1955 he also collected 15 medals in the standing high jump and standing long jump at the national championships.

References

External links
  

1927 births
Possibly living people
Swedish decathletes
Olympic athletes of Sweden
Athletes (track and field) at the 1948 Summer Olympics
Athletes (track and field) at the 1952 Summer Olympics
European Athletics Championships medalists
Living people